The Africa Research Bulletin is a peer-reviewed academic journal, appearing in two series - Political, Social and Cultural Series, and Economic, Financial and Technical Series. The journal was founded in 1964 by John Drysdale, a former British diplomat and historian, who also established its sister publication, the Asia Research Bulletin.

References

Wiley-Blackwell academic journals
Publications established in 1964
Monthly journals
African studies journals
English-language journals